Marcel "Marco" van Basten (born 31 October 1964) is a Dutch football manager and former player who played for Ajax and AC Milan, as well as the Netherlands national team. Widely regarded as one of the greatest strikers of all time, he scored 300 goals in a high-profile career, but played his last match in 1993, at the age of 28, due to an injury which forced his retirement two years later. He was later the head coach of Ajax and the Netherlands national team.

Known for his close ball control, attacking intelligence, impeccable headers, and spectacular strikes and volleys, Van Basten was named FIFA World Player of the Year in 1992 and won the Ballon d'Or three times, in 1988, 1989 and 1992. At club level, he won three Eredivisie titles and the Cup Winners' Cup with Ajax, and four Serie A titles and three European Cups with Milan. With the Netherlands, Van Basten won UEFA Euro 1988 where he earned the Golden Boot, scoring five goals, including a memorable volley in the final against the Soviet Union.

In 1998, Van Basten was ranked sixth in the FIFA Player of the Century internet poll, tenth in the European player of the Century election held by the IFFHS and 12th in the IFFHS' World Player of the Century election. He was also voted eighth in a poll organised by the French magazine France Football, consulting their former Ballon d'Or winners to elect the Football Player of the Century. In 2004, he was named by Pelé in the FIFA 100 list of the world's greatest living players. In 2004, a poll for the 100 greatest Dutch people was held in the Netherlands: Van Basten ranked number 25, the second highest for a football player, behind Johan Cruyff. In 2007, Sky Sports ranked Van Basten first on its list of great athletes who had their careers cut short.

Playing career

Early years
Marco van Basten was born on 31 October 1964 in Utrecht and grew up in the Oog In Al neighborhood. He began playing for a local team, EDO, when he was six years old. A year later, he moved to UVV Utrecht. After nine years there, he briefly played for another club from Utrecht, Elinkwijk.

Ajax

Ajax signed 16-year-old Marco for the 1981–82 season after his 19-year-old brother Stanley was rejected. Their father Joop had kept the younger son at another club with the hope that Ajax would take Stanley in professionally. He played his first match for Ajax on 3 April 1982, coming on as a substitute for Johan Cruyff, and scoring a debut goal in the team's 5–0 victory over NEC.

In the 1982–83 season, he competed with the European top scorer and first choice Holland international Wim Kieft for the position of centre forward, and scored nine goals in 20 league matches. Ajax chose to sell Kieft to Italian Serie A club Pisa the following season, and 18 year old Van Basten solidified his position as his team's main attacker similarly in the national team.

He was the top scorer in the league for four consecutive seasons, from 1983–84 to 1986–87, scoring 118 goals in 112 matches. In the 1985–86 season, he scored 37 goals in 26 league matches, including six goals against Sparta Rotterdam and five against Heracles Almelo, and won the European Golden Boot. He also scored the winning goal in the UEFA Cup Winners' Cup final against Lokomotive Leipzig in 1987. In total he scored 128 goals in 133 league matches for Ajax. In November 1986 he scored his most famous goal in an Ajax jersey, a spectacular overhead kick against FC Den Bosch.

AC Milan

In 1987, AC Milan president Silvio Berlusconi signed Van Basten, along with fellow countryman Ruud Gullit. In 1988 the Dutch legion got complete when Frank Rijkaard joined the club (at the time three non-Italians were allowed). In his first season, Milan won their first Scudetto in eight years, but van Basten played only 11 matches and was constantly troubled by an ankle injury. In 1988–89, Van Basten won the Ballon d'Or as Europe's top footballer. He scored 19 goals in Serie A and 32 goals in all competitions that year, including two goals in the final of the European Cup, as Milan triumphed against Steaua București. In 1989–90, he became Capocannoniere again (Serie A's leading goal scorer); Milan also successfully defended the European Cup after beating Benfica 1–0 in the final match, during which Van Basten provided the assist for Rijkaard's match-winning goal.

Milan struggled in the 1990–91 season, as Sampdoria won the Scudetto. After Van Basten fell out with Arrigo Sacchi, Berlusconi sacked the manager. Fabio Capello took over the following season, and Milan went undefeated in the league to win another Scudetto. Van Basten scored 25 league goals, and became Capocannoniere again; his tally from the 1991–92 season was the highest number of goals that a player had scored in a single Serie A season since Luís Vinício achieved the same tally during the 1965–66 season.

In November 1992, he became the first player to score four goals in a Champions League match, against IFK Göteborg, including a picture perfect bicycle kick. In December 1992, Van Basten was named FIFA World Player of the Year. Milan stretched their unbeaten run into the 1992–93 season, going 58 matches over two seasons before they lost a match. Van Basten was exceptional in the early part of the season. He was again voted the European player of the year, becoming the third player after Johan Cruyff and Michel Platini to win the award three times.

His troublesome ankle injury recurred in a game against Ancona, forcing him to endure another six-month layoff, and undergo a series of surgeries. He returned for the last few matches in the season, before Milan lost 1–0 to Marseille in the Champions League final. The match was Van Basten's final match for the Italian club. He came off in the 86th minute for Stefano Eranio, after a hard tackle behind from Basile Boli condemned Van Basten to the third ankle surgery of his career.

Van Basten had been hopeful of playing for his country at the 1994 World Cup as well as for his club in the 1994–95 season after spending the whole 1993–94 season out of action (missing Milan's victory in the European Cup as well as their Serie A title glory), but his club ordered him not to take part in the World Cup amid fear of ruining his rehabilitation. He finally conceded defeat in his battle to recover on 17 August 1995, when he announced his retirement as a player after two whole years on sidelines. Van Basten made a farewell appearance to thank the Milan fans before a home game at the San Siro, with an emotional Milan coach Fabio Capello breaking down in tears.

International career

Van Basten's talent was already noticed at a young age and he was called up for the 1983 FIFA World Youth Championship. He made his senior debut for the Netherlands national team that same year. His team-mates in the national team were all teenagers themselves Ruud Gullit, Gerald Vanenburg, Ronald Koeman and Frank Rijkaard as Holland was desperate to reclaim the success of the Cruyff generation in the 1970s. At UEFA Euro 1988, Van Basten played a pivotal role in the Dutch team's victorious campaign. He scored a total of five goals, including a hat trick against England in the first round, the winning goal in the semi-final against West Germany, and a spectacular volley from an acute angle in the 2–0 final against the Soviet Union, during which he also provided the assist for Gullit's opening goal. He finished the competition as the top scorer and was named player of the tournament. In a 2002 UK poll Van Basten's volley against the Soviet Union was ranked #21 in the list of the 100 Greatest Sporting Moments.

The Dutch national team exited the 1990 World Cup early, losing to West Germany in the second round. Van Basten never scored in the World Cup finals. At UEFA Euro 1992, the Netherlands defeated reigning World Champions Germany 3–1 in the first round to top their group and reach the semi-finals, where they shockingly lost to the eventual champions Denmark in a penalty shootout, with Peter Schmeichel saving a penalty shot from Van Basten. Van Basten was named to the European Championship Player Of The Tournament for a second time in 1992.

After retirement

Van Basten played in the Demetrio Albertini testimonial match at the San Siro in March 2006, and headed in a goal before being substituted early in the first half. On 22 July 2006, he also returned for the testimonial match to celebrate the 11-year Arsenal career of Dennis Bergkamp, in what was the first match played at the new Emirates Stadium. He played in the second half for the Ajax legends team. He entered the match as part of a double substitution that also introduced Johan Cruyff. He took part in Tyskie's (a Polish beer company) advertising campaign with Luís Figo and Zbigniew Boniek.

Player profile

Style of play
Regarded as one of the greatest and most complete strikers and players in the history of the sport, due to his prolific goalscoring and great skill set, Van Basten was dubbed the "Swan Of Utrecht" for his elegance and intelligent attacking play, and was known for his penchant for scoring acrobatic goals. His height and strength allowed him to excel in the air, and his technical ability and agility saw him execute spectacular strikes throughout his career, such as volleys and bicycle kicks. A fast and opportunistic striker with quick reactions and excellent movement, he often took advantage of loose balls in the penalty area due to his ability to anticipate defenders, and was capable of both controlling fast and difficult balls well with one touch, or even shooting first time. Possessing a powerful and accurate shot, and clinical, varied finishing from anywhere along the pitch, he was capable of scoring goals with either foot from inside or outside the penalty area, as well as with his head; he was also an accurate penalty kick and free-kick taker. Throughout his career, Van Basten converted 53 penalties out of the 57 he took, with a 93.0% success rate, the sixth highest in history, behind Ledio Pano (100%), Matthew Le Tissier (97.9%), Zico (97.8%), Cuauhtémoc Blanco (97.3%), and Ferenc Puskás (96.7%). Before taking penalties, Van Basten often used to perform a characteristic hop.

Although he was mainly known as a traditional attacker who operated in the penalty area as a centre-forward throughout his career, Van Basten also possessed excellent vision and distribution, in addition to his goalscoring ability, which enabled him to play in deeper, more creative positions, as a second striker, for example, and which allowed him to participate in the build-up of attacking plays and provide assists to his teammates in addition to scoring goals himself; one of his most notable assists was the one he provided to Frank Rijkaard for Milan's winning goal in the 1990 European Cup final against Benfica. Despite his large stature, Van Basten possessed excellent technical skills and ball control, as well as good balance and a notable elegance on the ball, which inspired his nickname. As such, his strong physique, combined with his close control, also enabled him to hold up the ball for teammates when playing with his back to goal.

Despite his ability, Van Basten's career was severely affected by many grave injuries, which eventually forced him to retire from football prematurely at the age of 28. Lack of protection from referees and inadequate football rules against rugged defending and tackles from behind were identified as the source of the injuries which ultimately led to his career's demise; consequently, Van Basten's early retirement due to his injuries led to widespread debate in the football world over whether rash challenges from behind should be rendered illegal in football, in order to protect talented players more effectively. During the 1994 World Cup, an automatic red was also shown for tackles from behind or with studs showing. In 1998, prior to the World Cup that year, FIFA completely outlawed the tackle from behind; this ruling came to be known colloquially as the "Van Basten law" in the media. Although Van Basten was known for often being on the receiving end of hard challenges from his opponents throughout his career, former referee Daniele Tombolini described Van Basten as a player who was known for his physical play himself, and who utilised his strength and committed a lot of fouls during matches.

Reception and legacy
Considered by pundits to be one of the greatest and most complete players of all time, in 1998, Van Basten was ranked sixth in the FIFA Player of the Century internet poll, tenth in the European player of the Century election held by the IFFHS, and 12th in the IFFHS World Player of the Century election. He was also ranked eighth in a poll to determine France Footballs "Football Player of the Century." In 1999, Van Basten was named the ninth greatest player of the twentieth Century by World Soccer magazine. In 2004, he was named by Pelé in the FIFA 100, his list of the world's 125 greatest living players, and also placed fourth in the UEFA Golden Jubilee Poll, celebrating the best European footballers of the past fifty years. He was also ranked 25th in a poll for the 100 greatest Dutch people. In 2007, Sky Sports ranked Van Basten first on its list of great athletes who had their careers cut short. In 2016 Van Basten was included in UEFA's All-time Euro XI, while in 2017, he was named the 13th greatest player of all time by FourFourTwo .

Numerous players, managers, and other footballing figures have also lauded Van Basten as one of the greatest players of all time. In 1994, defender Pietro Vierchowod described Van Basten as "the absolute number one" and as a "superstar," also adding that "he is strong with his head, good with either foot, capable of changing the face of a game with a single play or, [even] when he is not at his best, of becoming the best assist-provider for his teammates." Former defender Jürgen Kohler, who often faced Van Basten throughout his career, described him as "a player with exceptional abilities. He was a big personality not only as a sportsman, but also as a private person. I benefited from him. It is as simple as this. He was a big milestone in my career and for me he is one of the players who are the most outstanding personalities of the last century. Not only in sports, also as a human being." When asked of their duels, he commented: "the duels between us were simply tough with everything football offers. He stood and I delivered and then I stood and he delivered."

Former Arsenal player Tony Adams described Van Basten as the toughest and most difficult opponent he had ever faced in 2006, stating: "He’s the quickest 6 ft 3 in centre-forward I’ve ever seen! Just awesome. He was as quick as Ian Wright, as good in the air as Joe Jordan and he held the ball up better than Alan Smith. I put him in front of Maradona. Technically, Maradona was brilliant and he had amazing feet, but Van Basten could head, volley – he had power and strength." Fellow former defender Giuseppe Bergomi also described Van Basten as the strongest player he ever faced in 2018, commenting: "The best player of all time for me [...] is Maradona, but the strongest player I ever faced was Van Basten because at least I could beat Maradona to the ball with my head."

In 2017, two of Van Basten's former Milan teammates, Demetrio Albertini and Marco Simone, labelled the Dutchman as the best player they had ever played with, with the former stating, "The best player I have ever played with is Van Basten, the best overall. He had elegance and strength. He stopped playing at only 28 years of age, which is truly young." That same year, another one of his fellow former Milan teammates, Paolo Maldini, labelled Van Basten as the most complete player with whom he had ever played. Another former Milan teammate of Van Basten, Giovanni Cornacchini, described the Dutch striker as the greatest player of all time in 2019. Former Milan Vice-Chairman and CEO Adriano Galliani instead described Van Basten as Milan's greatest player ever in 2018. In 2017, Roberto Baggio named Van Basten as the player with whom he would have most liked to have played, commenting: "I'd have liked to play with him. He's the player that I exchanged shirts with most willingly."

In 2019, Van Basten's former Milan coach Fabio Capello described Van Basten and Ronaldo as the best players he ever coached. His predecessor at Milan, Arrigo Sacchi, described Van Basten as the best striker of all time in 2014, commenting: "Marco van Basten remains for me the best striker of all time. No other forward has worked as hard for the team as Marco did at Milan. I above all remember him for his elegance, his grace and his incredible quality." When Hernán Crespo was asked in 2015 who was the greatest centre-forward of all time, he echoed Sacchi's views, responding: "Marco van Basten. He did everything: dribbling, shooting, headers, acrobatics. And he played with his team and for his team." In 2019, Antonio Cassano described Van Basten and Ronaldo as the best forwards in the history of the game.

Media and sponsorship
Van Basten features in EA Sports' FIFA video game series, and was named in the Ultimate Team Legends in FIFA 14. Throughout his playing career, Van Basten was sponsored by Italian sportswear company Diadora. One of the most marketable players in the world, in the late 1980s Diadora launched his own personalized football boots, the San Siro Van Basten, earning him two million dollars over 5 years.

After his retirement from coaching, Van Basten became an analyst, and was described by ESPN in 2016 as a "rather cerebral" analyst who "ponders the problems of FIFA and suggests changes to the offside rule."  On 23 November 2019, while Van Basten was working as an analyst for the Dutch edition of the Fox Sports network, he said "Sieg Heil" (meaning "Hail victory" in German), a verbal salutation associated with the Nazi salute, during a live broadcast. Van Basten stated that he believed his microphone was off when he made the remark, and that it was in response to his colleague Hans Kraay's interview with Heracles's German manager, Frank Wormuth, following the team's 4–1 loss to Ajax. Van Basten said: "It wasn't my intention to shock people, I apologise. I just wanted to make a comment about Hans' German. It was an ill-placed joke." His use of the term attracted particular controversy as it occurred on a weekend during which Dutch football clubs were observing a minute of silence prior to matches in protest against discrimination. Following the incident, the network described Van Basten's comment as "stupid and inappropriate," and suspended him until 7 December. Electronic Arts also announced that Van Basten's cards in FIFA Ultimate Team would no longer be available in FIFA 20 stating the company has "an expectation that our commitment to quality and diversity is upheld." However he has returned to FIFA 21.

Managerial career

Ajax B
Van Basten officially left Milan in 1995 and retired from football, stating he would never try management. However, he changed his mind and took a course with the Royal Dutch Football Association (KNVB). His first stint as a manager was as an assistant to his former teammate John van 't Schip with the second team of Ajax in 2003–04.

Netherlands
On 29 July 2004, Van Basten was named the new manager of the Netherlands national team, with Van 't Schip as his assistant. Van Basten's appointment as manager of the Netherlands sparked a little controversy at the time, since he only just started his managerial career and the media argued that he did not have a lot of experience yet.

As a manager, he soon established himself as a man of strong principles. Van Basten famously dropped regulars like Clarence Seedorf, Patrick Kluivert, Edgar Davids and Roy Makaay and benched Mark van Bommel, because he believed that they were either past their prime or constantly underachieving. There were also calls for Van Basten to call up Dennis Bergkamp, who had retired from the national team six years earlier, for a final "hurrah," as he was retiring that season. Van Basten then revealed to the media that he never intended to do so, despite Bergkamp's own willingness.

For probably the first time in decades, none of the "Big Three" Clubs (Ajax, PSV and Feyenoord) provided the backbone for the national team. Instead, newcomer AZ led the way with players such as Denny Landzaat, Barry Opdam, Barry van Galen, Ron Vlaar, Jan Kromkamp and Joris Mathijsen. AZ, at the time a local small football club for Dutch standards, proved to be successful in the Dutch league and in the UEFA Cup. Other unheralded choices were Khalid Boulahrouz, Hedwiges Maduro, Ryan Babel and Romeo Castelen. Van Basten had also wanted to include Ivorian forward Salomon Kalou, but was thwarted when Kalou was denied Dutch citizenship by the immigration authorities headed by Dutch Minister of Integration Rita Verdonk. Kalou eventually accepted a call-up to play for Ivory Coast.

Under his guidance, the team were unbeaten in their World Cup qualification group and made it through the group stages at the 2006 World Cup, but were eliminated in a frenzied 1–0 loss to Portugal in the Round of 16. Van Basten was heavily criticised for dropping Ruud van Nistelrooy before this match, in favour of Dirk Kuyt, who did not score throughout the entire tournament.

In November 2006, Van Basten recalled exiled Milan midfielder Clarence Seedorf for a friendly against England at the Amsterdam Arena. In May 2007, Van Basten announced the end of his long-running dispute with Ruud van Nistelrooy, who had previously declared never to play for a Dutch national squad with Van Basten as its manager. Other players, such as Roy Makaay, Mark van Bommel, Boudewijn Zenden and Edgar Davids, however, remained out of favour.

Van Basten had a contract with the KNVB for managing the Dutch national side until 2008. The KNVB had expressed its wishes to extend his contract to include the World Cup qualification route to 2010 World Cup in South Africa. On 22 February 2008, Van Basten signed a four-year contract with Ajax, starting from 1 July. His last tournament thus was the UEFA Euro 2008, where the Netherlands surprised with a strong first round performance. They beat world champions Italy 3–0 in their first match, followed by a 4–1 win over World Cup runners-up France. In their third match, having already qualified for the next round, Van Basten selected non-regulars such as Maarten Stekelenburg, Wilfred Bouma and Ibrahim Afellay for the starting lineup against Romania, a match the Oranje won 2–0. In the quarter-finals, Van Basten faced fellow Dutchman Guus Hiddink's Russia. With the score at 1–1 after 90 minutes, Hiddink and Russia went on to win the match 3–1 in extra-time. He finished his reign with a record of 35 wins, 11 draws and six losses in 52 matches.

Return to Ajax
Van Basten became manager of Ajax after Euro 2008 but resigned on 6 May 2009 after his team failed to qualify for the Champions League. Van Basten started the season well, having spent millions on players such as Miralem Sulejmani, Ismaïl Aissati, Darío Cvitanich, Evander Sno, Eyong Enoh and Oleguer. However, in the second half of the season, striker Klaas-Jan Huntelaar left for Real Madrid, and Van Basten started switching around his lineups. When Ajax lost 11 points in four matches, the Eredivisie title was out of sight. However, Ajax still had the chance to finish in second place, which would have ensured a place in the third qualifying round of the Champions League. Two important losses against PSV (6–2) and Sparta Rotterdam (4–0), however, ensured that Van Basten's Ajax could only finish third in the league. Van Basten decided to resign as Ajax manager at the end of the 2008–09 season. Van Basten subsequently became a pundit for Sport1, but was still planning to return as a manager. He finished his reign with a record of 26 wins, 8 draws and 11 losses in 45 matches.

Heerenveen
On 13 February 2012, it was announced that Van Basten would become the manager of Eredivisie club Heerenveen in the 2012–13 season. Van Basten led Heerenveen to an eighth-place finish in the 2012–13 year campaign. He then led them to a fifth-place finish the following season, during the 2013–14 campaign. He finished his reign with a record of 27 wins, 18 draws and 27 losses in 72 matches.

AZ
AZ Alkmaar announced on 18 April 2014 that Van Basten would replace Dick Advocaat at the start of the 2014–15 season. On 28 August 2014, Van Basten took a leave of absence for the following match against Dordrecht, with multiple Dutch news outlets reporting he was suffering of stress-related heart palpitations, and was replaced by assistant coaches Alex Pastoor and Dennis Haar. Later, on 3 September, AZ confirmed that Van Basten was given an extended leave of absence until 14 September. On 16 September 2014, parties agreed Van Basten would relinquish his role as manager in order to sign a new contract as assistant coach until 2016; this was motivated by Van Basten himself, who stated the stress caused by his full-time role as head coach was causing him physical and mental issues. He finished his stint with two wins and three losses in five matches.

FIFA technical director

After a year at AZ, Van Basten decided to take up the vacant post of assistant coach under the new head coach of the Netherlands national team, Danny Blind. Van Basten would work together with fellow assistant coach Ruud van Nistelrooy, whom Van Basten had initially sent away when he was head coach of the Netherlands. In August 2016, Van Basten announced he would be leaving the role to take up a position at FIFA as technical director.

In March 2018, Van Basten travelled to Iran with FIFA president Gianni Infantino to mark 100 years of the Iran Football Federation. After meeting Iranian President Hassan Rouhani they were welcomed by the president of Iranian Football Federation Mehdi Taj at the Tehran Olympic Hotel. Attending the Tehran Derby, Van Basten called for the ban on women entering sports venues to be lifted.

Career statistics

Club

International 

Scores and results list the Netherlands' goal tally first, score column indicates score after each van Basten goal.

Managerial statistics

International matches
Matches as manager

Honours

Ajax
Eredivisie: 1981–82, 1982–83, 1984–85
KNVB Cup: 1982–83, 1985–86, 1986–87
European Cup Winners' Cup: 1986–87

A.C. Milan
Serie A: 1987–88, 1991–92, 1992–93
Supercoppa Italiana: 1988, 1992
European Cup: 1988–89, 1989–90
European Super Cup: 1989
Intercontinental Cup: 1989, 1990

Netherlands
UEFA European Championship: 1988

Individual
 Ballon d'Or: 1988, 1989, 1992
 FIFA World Player of the Year: 1992
 UEFA Best Player of the Year: 1989, 1990, 1992
 European Cup Top Scorer: 1988–89
 Serie A Golden Boot: 1989–90, 1991–92
 Eredivisie Top Scorer: 1983–84, 1984–85, 1985–86, 1986–87
 European Silver Boot: 1983–84
 Dutch Footballer of the Year: 1985
 European Golden Boot: 1985–86
 World Golden Boot: 1985–86
 Bravo Award: 1987
 Onze d'Argent: 1987, 1992
 Onze d'Or: 1988, 1989
Onze de Onze: 1987, 1988, 1989, 1991, 1992
 IFFHS World's Best Player: 1988, 1989
 World Soccer Player of the Year: 1987 (3rd), 1988, 1989 (2nd), 1992
RSSSF Player of the Year: 1992
El País King of European Soccer: 1992
 UEFA Euro 1988: Top Scorer and Best Player with 5 goals
UEFA European Championship Team of the Tournament: 1988, 1992
Planète Foot World All-Time Team: 1996
Planète Foot's 50 of the World's Best Players: 1996
Venerdì's 100 Magnificent: 1997
IFFHS Football Player of the Century 12th: 1999
Placar's 100 Best Players of the Century 26th: 1999
France Football's Football Player of the Century 8th: 1999
World Soccer Greatest Players of the 20th Century 9th: 1999
Guerin' Sportivo's 50 Greatest Players of the Century by Adalberto Bortolotti 11th: 1999
 FIFA 100 (List of the greatest living footballers picked by Pelé): 2004
AFS Top-100 Players of All-Time 12th: 2007
 UEFA Golden Jubilee Poll: #4
 Italian Football Hall of Fame: 2012
World Hall of Fame of Soccer: 2012
 UEFA Euro All-time XI (published 2016)
 AC Milan Hall of Fame
 IFFHS Legends
Voetbal International's World Stars by Raf Willems
Ballon d'Or Dream Team (Bronze): 2020

Notes

References

External links

 
 Marco van Basten extensive profile at AC Milan Online
 
 Marco van Basten dedicated fanpage

1964 births
Living people
Footballers from Utrecht (city)
Dutch footballers
Association football forwards
USV Elinkwijk players
AFC Ajax players
A.C. Milan players
Eredivisie players
Serie A players
Netherlands youth international footballers
Netherlands under-21 international footballers
Netherlands international footballers
UEFA Euro 1988 players
1990 FIFA World Cup players
UEFA Euro 1992 players
UEFA European Championship-winning players
World Soccer Magazine World Player of the Year winners
FIFA World Player of the Year winners
Ballon d'Or winners
FIFA 100
Dutch expatriate footballers
Dutch expatriate sportspeople in Italy
Expatriate footballers in Italy
Dutch football managers
AFC Ajax non-playing staff
Jong Ajax managers
Netherlands national football team managers
AFC Ajax managers
SC Heerenveen managers
AZ Alkmaar managers
Eredivisie managers
2006 FIFA World Cup managers
UEFA Euro 2008 managers
AZ Alkmaar non-playing staff
UVV players